El Malo (The Bad [One]) is the debut album of Willie Colón, which he recorded when he was sixteen years old. The cover design featured a double photo of Colón. 21-year-old Héctor Lavoe was brought on board by the producers. The title track featured in the soundtrack on the video game Grand Theft Auto: Vice City Stories on the fictitious Latin music radio station "Radio Espantoso".

Track listing
 "Jazzy" Colón - 4:00
 "Willie Baby" Colón - 2:46
 "Borinquen" Public Domain - 3:15
 "Willie Whopper" Colón - 2:40
 "El Malo" Colón - 3:57
 "Skinny Papa" Colón - 4:00
 "Chonqui" Brewster, Colón - 4:07
 "Quimbombo" Brewster, Colón - 5:00

Personnel
Dwight Brewster: piano
Willie Colón: trombone, director, lead
Yayo el Indio: vocals
Irv Elkin: photography
Irving Greenbaum: audio engineer
Eddie Guagua: bass
Lubi Jovanovic: liner notes
Bob Katz: mastering
Héctor Lavoe: vocals
Nicky Marrero: timbales
Jerry Masucci: producer
Johnny Pacheco: director, recording director
Elliot Romero: vocals
Pablo Rosario: bongos
Joe Santiago: trombone
James Taylor: bass

References

1967 debut albums
Albums produced by Willie Colón
Spanish-language albums
Willie Colón albums
Fania Records albums